Courtney Duffus (born 24 October 1995) is a professional footballer who plays as a forward for Morecambe. He is a former Republic of Ireland U21 international.

Club career

Everton
Duffus joined Everton in the summer of 2012 from Cheltenham Town. It came after Courtney, along with his younger brother, Tyrone impressed in the trial earlier that year.

While at the academy, Duffus progressed through the ranks for the side and helped the side win the Gothia Cup and the league's U18 title. After being recalled from a loan spell at Bury, Duffus returned to the reserves and appeared in the first team as an unused substitute, in a 4–1 win over BSC Young Boys on 19 February 2015, in the Round of 32 of the UEFA Europa League. Despite suffering a knee injury following this, Duffus signed a two-year contract with the club at the end of the season.

In the 2015–16 season, Duffus played a vital role for the reserve side when he regained his form at the end of the year and his performance resulted him being named the Premier League's Under-21 Player of the Month for March. The following season saw Duffus helped the side win the Premier League U23 title. After the 2016–17 season ended, which saw Tyrone released, Duffus signed a one-year contract extension with the club.

Bury (loan)
On 24 October 2014, Duffus joined League Two side Bury on loan until January. He made his debut a day later, starting the match and playing 59 minutes in a 1–1 draw with Southend United at Roots Hall. Duffus went on to make two appearances for the side before being recalled in November 2014.

Oldham Athletic
Not long after signing a contract with Everton, on 18 July 2017, Duffus joined Oldham Athletic on an undisclosed fee, signing a two-year contract with the option of a third. Upon joining the club, he was given a number 21 shirt ahead of the new season.

Duffus made his Oldham Athletic debut, coming on as a second-half substitute, in a 2–0 loss against Oxford United in the opening game of the season.

Waterford (loan)
In February 2018 Duffus joined League of Ireland Premier Division side Waterford on loan. On 26 February, he made his debut, starting in the 2–0 win over St Patrick's Athletic. Duffus scored his first goal for Waterford in the 2–1 win over Sligo Rovers. Duffus scored two crucial goals for Waterford as he was named man of the match in their 2–1 over Shamrock Rovers on the 23 March.

Yeovil Town
On 31 January 2019, Duffus joined Yeovil Town on a -year deal for an undisclosed fee.

Bromley
On 15 January 2021, Duffus left Yeovil Town to join fellow National League side Bromley for an undisclosed fee.

Morecambe
On 19 August 2021, Duffus joined League One side Morecambe for an undisclosed fee signing a two-year contract.

On 24 March 2022, Duffus joined National League club Stockport County on loan until the end of the 2021–22 season. He made his debut on 2 May in Stockport's 1–0 win away at Chesterfield.

International career
Duffus, and his brother Tyrone, are eligible to play for England (due to being born there), Republic of Ireland, due to his Irish mother, and Jamaica, due to his Jamaican father.

In September 2016, Duffus was called by Republic of Ireland U21 for the first time and made his first appearance for Republic of Ireland U21s in a Euro qualifier against Slovenia. Duffus scored his first Republic of Ireland U21 goal in his third appearance for the national side, in a 3–1 loss against Serbia U21.

Personal life
Courtney's younger brother, Tyrone, plays for Swindon Supermarine. The pair also attended All Saints' Academy. Between 2019 and 2022, Duffus was in a relationship with British tennis player Heather Watson.

Career statistics

References

External links

1995 births
Living people
Sportspeople from Cheltenham
English footballers
Association football forwards
Everton F.C. players
Bury F.C. players
Oldham Athletic A.F.C. players
Waterford F.C. players
Yeovil Town F.C. players
Bromley F.C. players
Morecambe F.C. players
Stockport County F.C. players
English Football League players
League of Ireland players
National League (English football) players
Republic of Ireland under-21 international footballers
English people of Irish descent
English people of Jamaican descent